Lipovice or Lipovicë may refer to:

Lipovice (Kalesija), Bosnia and Herzegovina
Lipovice (Prachatice District), Czech Republic
Lipovicë, Lipjan, Kosovo
Lipovica (peak in Kosovo), Albanian form Lipovicë

See also
Lipovica (disambiguation), Serbian toponym